In the US state of Texas, Interstate 40 (I-40) runs west–east through the panhandle in the northwest part of the state. The only large city it passes through is Amarillo, where it meets the north end of I-27.

History

Before the U.S. Highway system, this system of interconnected highway from New Mexico to Oklahoma was part of the Texas highway system and a portion of the Ozark Trails which closely paralleled the Chicago, Rock Island and Pacific Railway. When the United States Numbered Highway system was introduced in 1926, U.S. Highway 66 (US 66) across the Texas Panhandle was designated along existing roads in the Texas highway network. The entire route was paved by 1938. There have been various realignments, including one in 1959, to allow expansion of the Amarillo Air Force Base.

In 1956, the Interstate Highway Act designated US 66 through Texas as a section of highway eligible for limited access upgrades.

During the next 20 years, most of the highway was upgraded in place to keep construction costs low. With the limited access of the Interstates, towns on the highway had to be bypassed. Most towns requested to remain as close to the new highway as possible to minimize tourism losses. Bypassed towns included Glenrio, Adrian, Vega, Conway, Groom, Jericho, Alanreed, McLean, and Shamrock. A new routing along the south end of downtown Amarillo was also built, connecting with the already-built expressway leading south from downtown toward Canyon. In 1985, the entire designation of US 66 was removed as the entire route had been displaced by I-40.

Route description

I-40 in Texas is one of a few Interstate Highways with at-grade intersections. The westernmost part of I-40 in Texas, near the New Mexico border, lacks the frontage roads typical to Texas freeways, and eight driveways for ranches directly intersect the main lanes of I-40, in violation of Interstate standards. The entirety of I-40 in Texas is located in the panhandle.

I-40 enters Texas from New Mexico just north of Glenrio. The highway's first exit, exit 0, is for Business Interstate 40-A (Bus. I-40-A), which serves the town of Glenrio. I-40 briefly runs through Deaf Smith County before entering Oldham County. The Interstate gains frontage roads between exits 15 and 18 and turns from a northeast direction into a straight east direction. I-40 bypasses the town of Adrian before turning southeast. I-40 next bypasses the town of Vega, where it meets with US 385 at exit 36. The Interstate briefly runs in an east direction through the town of Wildorado before turning back to the southeast. I-40 has a mostly rural route before becoming more suburban in Bushland, with housing developments becoming visible from the highway. The Interstate passes by Cadillac Ranch before the Hope Road interchange and enters the city limits of Amarillo just west of State Highway Loop 335 (Loop 335). I-40 expands from four lanes to six at Loop 335 and runs through a heavily developed area of the city. Near downtown, the highway serves as the northern terminus for I-27 at a turbine interchange and begins an overlap with US 287.

I-40 runs through eastern Amarillo, passing by the American Quarter Horse Hall of Fame and The Big Texan Steak Ranch. Development along the route begins to lessen after South Eastern Street as the highway passes near Rick Husband Amarillo International Airport. US 287 leaves I-40 at exit 78 as the Interstate leaves the city limits of Amarillo. The highway runs primarily through rural farmland after leaving the city and enters the town of Groom, passing near a 19-story cross and a leaning water tower. East of Groom, I-40 has an overlap with State Highway 70 (SH 70) between exits 121 and 124. After the overlap with SH 70 ends, the terrain along the Interstate begins to change from flat plains to a rolling canyon ridge with an observation point near Alanreed. I-40 returns to flatland again after the town of McLean and bypasses the town of Shamrock before entering Oklahoma near Texola.

Exit list

Business routes and old alignments

I-40 has seven business routes in Texas, all of which are old alignments of US 66. A number of other old alignments of US 66 are also present; most are marked on guide signs on I-40.

 Bus. I-40-A (formerly State Highway Spur 504 (Spur 504)) is a business spur that runs from I-40 at Glenrio, just east of the New Mexico state line, southwest to the border. In New Mexico, the road forks—the later paved alignment (c. 1952) has been cut by I-40, and the earlier alignment west to San Jon is now a dirt road that had been paved when it was US 66 prior to 1952, but the paving was later removed by Quay County, New Mexico, commissioners due to high maintenance costs and low traffic volumes. Old US 66 (current Bus. I-40-A) through Glenrio was bypassed in 1973 by I-40.
 Bus. I-40-B (formerly Loop 550) is a business loop through Adrian. The road was bypassed c. 1969 by I-40 and carried US 66 until its 1985 decommissioning.
 Bus. I-40-C (formerly Loop 551) is a business loop through Vega. The road was bypassed c. 1973 by I-40 and carried US 66 until its 1985 decommissioning.
 Bus. I-40-D (formerly Loop 552) is a long business loop through Amarillo. An older alignment—Loop 279—carried Business U.S. Highway 66 (Bus. US 66). East of Amarillo, Farm to Market Road 2575 (FM 2575) is old US 66, rerouted to today's Bus. I-40-D in 1958 by the construction of Amarillo International Airport. Present Bus. I-40-D was bypassed in 1968 by I-40 and carried US 66 until its 1985 decommissioning.
 FM 2161 and SH 207 carry old US 66 through Conway. The road was bypassed c. 1966 by I-40 and carried US 66 until its 1985 decommissioning.
 Bus. I-40-F (formerly Loop 554) is a business loop through Groom. The road was bypassed c. 1980 by I-40 and carried US 66 until its 1985 decommissioning.
 The short Loop 271, in addition to providing access to FM 291, is old US 66 through Alanreed. The road was bypassed in 1953 by US 66, but the bypass was not upgraded to a freeway until c. 1982.
 Bus. I-40-H (formerly Loop 555) is a business loop through McLean. The road was bypassed c. 1984 by I-40 and carried US 66 until its 1985 decommissioning.
 Bus. I-40-J (formerly Loop 556) is a business loop through Shamrock. The road was bypassed c. 1973 by I-40 and carried US 66 until its 1985 decommissioning.
 Spur 30 is a short route from I-40 just west of the Oklahoma state line southeast to the border. In Oklahoma, the road is unnumbered though Texola, though it picks up I-40 Bus. at exit 5 to run through Erick. The road was bypassed c. 1972 by I-40 and carried US 66 until 1976 when it was moved onto I-40 in the area.

Future
In 2015, the Texas Department of Transportation (TxDOT) published the plans for the all new Loop 335 section that will encircle the city of Amarillo. TxDOT has planned multiple multilevel interchanges that intersect with I-40. The first, on the eastside of Amarillo, is a multilevel interchange that will provide access to both directions of I-40 and Loop 335. The second interchange with I-40, however, will be a full stack interchange. A new mainlane bridge that will accommodate up to six lanes is also in the works for I-40 near Helium Road, providing easier access to the new freeway. Although construction started in 2016, the project is not expected to be complete until 2022.

See also

Notes

References

External links

40
 Texas
Interstate 40
Transportation in Carson County, Texas
Transportation in Deaf Smith County, Texas
Transportation in Donley County, Texas
Transportation in Gray County, Texas
Transportation in Oldham County, Texas
Transportation in Potter County, Texas
Transportation in Wheeler County, Texas